Melleruds IF is a Swedish football club located in Mellerud in Västra Götaland County.

Background
Melleruds Idrottsförening were founded on 28 July 1908 at a meeting in the Jacobssons café at Köpmantorget in Mellerud. The first club chairman was Eric Widlund.

Since their foundation Melleruds IF has participated mainly in the middle divisions of the Swedish football league system.  The club currently plays in Division 3 Nordvästra Götaland which is the fifth tier of Swedish football. They play their home matches at the Rådavallen in Mellerud.

Melleruds IF are affiliated to the Dalslands Fotbollförbund.

Recent history
In recent seasons Melleruds IF have competed in the following divisions:

2011 – Division III, Nordvästra Götaland
2010 – Division III, Nordvästra Götaland
2009 – Division II, Mellersta Götaland
2008 – Division II, Västra Götaland
2007 – Division II, Västra Götaland
2006 – Division III, Nordvästra Götaland
2005 – Division II, Västra Götaland
2004 – Division III, Nordvästra Götaland
2003 – Division II, Västra Götaland
2002 – Division III, Nordvästra Götaland
2001 – Division IV, Bohuslän/Dal
2000 – Division IV, Bohuslän/Dal
1999 – Division IV, Bohuslän/Dal
1998 – Division III, Nordvästra Götaland
1997 – Division III, Nordvästra Götaland
1996 – Division III, Nordvästra Götaland
1995 – Division II, Västra Götaland
1994 – Division II, Västra Götaland
1993 – Division II, Västra Götaland

Attendances

In recent seasons Melleruds IF have had the following average attendances:

Footnotes

External links
 Melleruds IF – Official website
  Melleruds IF Facebook

Football clubs in Västra Götaland County
Association football clubs established in 1908
1908 establishments in Sweden